Laila Storch (February 28, 1921 – December 2, 2022) was an American oboist.

Biography
She was the first woman oboist to graduate from the Curtis Institute in Philadelphia, where she studied with Marcel Tabuteau.

Career
Storch was the principal oboist for the Houston Symphony Orchestra, Carmel Bach Festival, the Bethlehem Bach Festival, Marlboro Music Festival, and the Casals Festivals. Additionally, she played with the National Symphony Orchestra, the Kansas City Philharmonic, and the Puerto Rico Symphony Orchestra. She was professor of oboe at the Conservatory of Music of Puerto Rico, for many years at the University of Washington and guest professor at Indiana University as well as the Central Conservatory of Music in Beijing, China. She was one of the longest serving members of the Soni Ventorum Wind Quintet.

Storch published a biography of her mentor Marcel Tabuteau, longtime Curtis Institute faculty member and world-renowned solo oboist (1915–1954) of the Philadelphia Orchestra, titled How Do You Expect to Play the Oboe If You Can’t Peel a Mushroom? (Indiana University Press).

Storch died on Orcas Island, Washington, on December 2, 2022, aged 101.

Bibliography

References

External Links
 

1921 births
2022 deaths
American classical oboists
Curtis Institute of Music alumni
University of Washington faculty
Academic staff of the Central Conservatory of Music
Women oboists
American centenarians
Women centenarians
20th-century American musicians
20th-century American women musicians
20th-century classical musicians